Sporveien T-banen AS is a limited company that is responsible for operating Oslo Metro, the rapid transit in Oslo, Norway. The company is owned by Sporveien, which is owned by the city council. Sporveien operates on a contract with Ruter, the public transport administration in Oslo and Akershus.

The company has 521 employees, and operates 217 metro cars with a line length of 103.9 km. A total of 63.5 million passengers used the rapid transit in Oslo in 2005, 36% of the total public transport ridership in the city.

References

Railway companies of Norway
Oslo Sporveier
Oslo Metro